

Arthropods

Newly named insects

Sauropterygia

Newly named plesiosaurs

Ichthyosaurs

Newly named ichthyosaurs

Other

References

1870s in paleontology
Paleontology, 1873 In